Hagenbeck may refer to:
 Tierpark Hagenbeck, a zoo in Hamburg
 Hagenbeck-Wallace Circus, American circus
 , a castle in Dorsten
 , a mine in Essen-Altendorf
 Circus Carl Hagenbeck and Circus Wilhelm Hagenbeck (later Circus Willy Hagenbeck), German circusses

People
 Franklin L. Hagenbeck (born 1949), general of the US Army
The brothers Gottfried C. Carl and Wilhelm with their descendants:
  (1810–1887), German businessman and founder of Hagenbeck's animal dealing
 Carl Hagenbeck (1844–1913), German animal dealer, zoo- and circus-director
 John Hagenbeck (1866–1940), organizer of human zoos, half-brother of Carl Hagenbeck
 John George Hagenbeck (1900–1959), ship dealer and organizer of human zoos, son of John Hagenbeck
 Wilhelm Hagenbeck (1850–1910), German circus-director
 Willy Hagenbeck (1884–1965), German circus-director

See also
 Haghenbeck, a surname